Baba TV (short for Basoga Baino Television) is a television channel in Uganda with viewership primarily concentrated in the country's eastern and central regions. It maintains studios in Jinja City and Kampala. It airs programming in Lusoga, Luganda, and English.

History 
Baba TV began broadcasting in August 2017 and is owned by Moses Grace Balyeku, former member of Parliament for Jinja West.

In 2019, Baba TV launched on DStv in Uganda. The station was launched on GOtv, the only digital platform that did not include it, in 2021.

On 27 July 2020, 2020, journalist Basajja Mivule, who hosted the political talk show Fumitiriza (Reflect) on Baba TV, was arrested at the Kampala studios; it was noted that he was critical of President Yoweri Museveni. Mivule was later suspended from the station.

References 

2017 establishments in Uganda
Television channels and stations established in 2017
Television stations in Uganda